Rick Thorpe is a Canadian politician. He was a BC Liberal Member of the Legislative Assembly in the province of British Columbia from 1996 to 2009, representing the riding of Okanagan-Westside.

A Certified Management Accountant, Thorpe was employed in the brewing industry for 22 years and then was a partner in a winery. He served as president of the Okanagan Wine Festival in 1994 and 1995.

References 

Year of birth missing (living people)
Living people
British Columbia Liberal Party MLAs
Canadian accountants
Members of the Executive Council of British Columbia
People from Summerland, British Columbia
21st-century Canadian politicians